Omer Golan (born 4 October 1982) is a former Israeli footballer. He played as a striker for his home club Maccabi Petah Tikva and for Lokeren.

Club career

Maccabi Petah Tikva
Golan played in the youth ranks of Maccabi Petah Tikva, before being transferred to the first team in 2000. In the 2003–04 Israeli Premier League, Golan was the third equal highest goalscorer, netting 13 times. In the 2005–06 Israeli Premier League, Golan was the fifth equal highest goalscorer, with 11 strikes.

Golan was a member of the winning Toto Cup side of 2003–04, who were victorious against Maccabi Haifa 3–0 in the final. Golan scored goals in the semi-finals and the final of the tournament. He scored the final goal of the semi-final that finished in a 3–1 win against Maccabi Netanya, and the last goal of the final against Maccabi Haifa.

Golan also scored a hat trick in the 2005–06 UEFA Cup first round qualifying against Macedonian side FK Bashkimi in an 11–0 aggregate victory for the Israeli side. Golan scored a second hat-trick in the next phase of qualification, the first round, against Serbian side FK Partizan to ensure a 5–4 aggregate progression to the group stages of the tournament. However, Maccabi was outclassed in the group stages, which included RCD Espanyol, U.S. Città di Palermo, FC Lokomotiv Moscow and Brøndby IF. Losing all of its matches, the Israeli club only managed one goal in four matches. This goal was scored by Golan in a 2–1 loss to Palermo.

In seven years with the club he made 207 appearances in all club competitions, scoring 67 times and provided 14 assists.

Lokeren
In December 2007, Omer Golan got his transfer to Europe when the Belgian club Lokeren paid an estimated $1 million to his former club, Maccabi Petah Tikva. One of his demands in the contract is that he could leave the club if a bigger club offers him a contract. Several Belgian top clubs such as Anderlecht and Standard as well as some English clubs, were reportedly wanting to sign him, but he finally signed in Lokeren, most likely due to the significantly higher wages which were offered to him.

In Golan's first season at Lokeren, the 2007–08 season, he scored 5 goals in 15 appearances. In his second season, he scored 6 goals in 29 appearances and in his last season with the club he scored 2 goals in 18 appearances. Overall in all club competitions he scored 13 times and made 6 assists in 64 games for Lokeren.

Maccabi Petah Tikva
After an unsuccessful spell at Lokeren, Golan returned to Maccabi Petah Tikva. In his first season back he scored 10 goals and made 1 assist in 28 games in all club competitions. In the 2011–12 season he had a very poor season only scoring 6 times in 33 games and Petah Tikva also had a poor season as they got relegated after 21 consecutive seasons in the top flight. The next season, he won with Petah Tikva the 2012–13 Liga Leumit as the club got promoted back to the Premier League, Golan had one of his best seasons as he scored 18 league goals and was one of the most important players for the team in that season.

On 13 March 2014, he retired from the game. He will be remembered as one of the greatest players in the history of Maccabi Petah Tikva, in 11 seasons with the club he made a total of 313 appearances and is the all time goalscorer for the club with 103 goals in all club competitions.

International career
Golan made his international debut for the Israel national football team when he came on as a 74th-minute substitute for Eyal Berkovich in a friendly against the Moldova national football team on 28 April 2004. His first international goal came on 9 February 2004 against the Croatia national football team, when he scored the final goal to tie the game at 3–3.

On 17 November 2007, Omer Golan scored the winning goal for Israel against Russia, handing England a lifeline in their qualification group for Euro 2008, meaning England could still qualify; if Russia had won, qualification for England would be near impossible. Golan was, for a short period, proclaimed a hero by English football fans; but England lost the match to Croatia meaning they did not qualify for Euro 2008. 

According to Golan, before he scored against Russia, many thought that he was on the national team because of his strong friendship with Avi Luzon, then IFA chief and former owner of Maccabi Petah Tikva.

Honours
 Toto Cup (1): 2003–04
 Liga Leumit (1): 2012–13

References

External links

1982 births
Living people
Israeli Jews
Israeli footballers
Maccabi Petah Tikva F.C. players
K.S.C. Lokeren Oost-Vlaanderen players
Israeli Premier League players
Belgian Pro League players
Israeli expatriate footballers
Expatriate footballers in Israel
Israeli expatriate sportspeople in Belgium
Israel international footballers
Footballers from Holon
Israeli people of Yemeni-Jewish descent
Association football forwards